Rylan Wiens (born January 2, 2002) is a Canadian diver in the platform (10 metre) events. Wiens currently resides and trains in Saskatoon, Saskatchewan.

Career
Wiens' first major team was at the 2018 Commonwealth Games, where he competed in the individual and synchro events.

At the 2021 FINA Diving World Cup, Wiens scored a 488.55 in the final, which won him the bronze medal. In July 2021, Wiens finished in second in the individual 10 m platform competition at the Canadian trials. This qualified him to compete in the individual 10 m event in Tokyo.

At the 2022 World Aquatics Championships in Budapest, Hungary, Wiens won the bronze medal in the synchronized 10 m platform event with partner Nathan Zsombor-Murray. He competed at the 2022 Commonwealth Games where he won silver medals in the men's 10 metre platform and men's synchronised 10 metre platform events.

References

External links

2002 births
Living people
Canadian male divers
Commonwealth Games medallists in diving
Commonwealth Games silver medallists for Canada
Divers at the 2018 Commonwealth Games
Divers at the 2022 Commonwealth Games
Divers at the 2020 Summer Olympics
Divers from Calgary
Olympic divers of Canada
Sportspeople from Saskatoon
World Aquatics Championships medalists in diving
Medallists at the 2022 Commonwealth Games